Porky's Hare Hunt is a 1938 Warner Bros. Looney Tunes animated short film directed by Ben "Bugs" Hardaway and an uncredited Cal Dalton, which stars Porky Pig as a hunter whose quarry is a little white rabbit. The short was released on April 30, 1938.

This cartoon marked the first appearance of the rabbit that would evolve into Bugs Bunny, who is barely recognizable compared to his more familiar later form. Bugs' first official appearance would come two years later in A Wild Hare.

Plot
Several rabbits are eating carrots and ruining crops. Another rabbit warns them to evacuate by saying "Jiggers, fellers!" Soon, Porky and his dog meet this rabbit and try to outwit him in the forest. Porky and the rabbit get into a fight and the hare thinks he has won. However Porky finds the rabbit, who shows Porky a photo of himself and of how many children he has with his wife. When Porky is about to shoot him, the gun fails.

After Porky attempts to shoot him, the rabbit asks Porky: "Do you have a hunting license?" As Porky reaches for his pocket to obtain the document, the hare suddenly snatches it out of Porky's grasp, rips it in two, says, "Well you haven't got one now!" and escapes by twisting his ears as though they were a helicopter propeller, flying away. But Porky throws a rock at the hare which sends him crashing into a haystack. He emerges from the stack appearing injured, but he suddenly grabs Porky and says one of Groucho Marx's lines from Duck Soup: "Of course, you know that this means war!" He then starts marching like one of the spirits of '76. Ultimately, the rabbit wins when Porky throws dynamite into the cave in which the rabbit is hiding and he throws the dynamite back. Later, Porky is in the hospital and the rabbit brings him flowers. Porky tells the rabbit that he will be out in a few days. "That's what YOU think!", the rabbit says, and then pulls on the anvil in Porky's bed, and runs out the window into the distance laughing.

Production
According to the cartoon's copyright date in the opening title card, this cartoon begin production in 1937, but was released in theatres on April 30, 1938.

Hardaway, according to Martha Sigall, said he was going to put "a rabbit suit on that duck", referring to Porky's Duck Hunt, released a year earlier.

The rabbit's hyperactive personality and laugh provided by Mel Blanc predated the 1940 Walter Lantz/Universal Pictures release Knock Knock which starred Andy Panda and introduced cartoon audiences to Woody Woodpecker, who was created for the Lantz studio by Hardaway after his departure from the Leon Schlesinger/Warner Bros. studio.

Music
The incidental music heard throughout the piece are scored arrangements of "Bei Mir Bistu Shein", a popular song which was a hit for The Andrews Sisters around this time, and "Hooray for Hollywood," from the contemporary motion picture Hollywood Hotel.

Home media
Blu-ray: Looney Tunes Platinum Collection: Volume 2, Disc 2
DVD: Porky Pig 101, Disc 2

Rediscovered colorized version
The redrawn colorized version was long considered to be a lost cartoon, until the redrawn was found on a recorded tape and uploaded on the Internet Archive on April 30, 2021, exactly 83 years after the short premiered in theaters.

References

External links

Porky's Hare Hunt (Restored) on Youtube

1938 films
1938 short films
1938 animated films
Looney Tunes shorts
Warner Bros. Cartoons animated short films
American black-and-white films
Films about hunters
Bugs Bunny films
Porky Pig films
Films directed by Ben Hardaway
Films directed by Cal Dalton
Films scored by Carl Stalling
Films produced by Leon Schlesinger
1930s Warner Bros. animated short films